Linda Ann Martin (born 12 June 1954) is a British fencer. She competed in the women's individual and team foil events at the 1980, 1984 and 1988 Summer Olympics.

References

1954 births
Living people
British female fencers
Olympic fencers of Great Britain
Fencers at the 1980 Summer Olympics
Fencers at the 1984 Summer Olympics
Fencers at the 1988 Summer Olympics
People from Deal, Kent